Saint-Louis-de-France Aerodrome  is located  northeast of Saint-Louis-de-France, Quebec, Canada.

References

Transport in Trois-Rivières
Registered aerodromes in Mauricie